Terrassa Rambla is a railway station of the Ferrocarrils de la Generalitat de Catalunya (FGC) train system in Vallès Occidental in the province of Barcelona, Catalonia, Spain. It is served by FGC line S1. The station is in fare zone 2C.

The current underground station was opened on 10 March 1987, replacing a previous at-grade station from 1921 which in turn replaced a provisional station from 1919.

References

Stations on the Barcelona–Vallès Line
Railway stations in Vallès Occidental
Railway stations in Spain opened in 1985
Transport in Terrassa
1985 establishments in Spain
1985 establishments in Catalonia
Railway stations in Spain opened in 1919